The non-marine molluscs of Russia are a part of the molluscan fauna of Russia. A number of species of non-marine molluscs are found in the wild in Russia.

Freshwater gastropods

Valvatidae
 Cincinna (Sibirovalvata) aliena (Westerlund, 1877)
 Cincinna (Sibirovalvata) confusa (Westerlund, 1897)
 Cincinna (Sibirovalvata) sibirica (Middendorff, 1851)

Lymnaeidae
 Galba (Galba) truncatula (O. F. Müller, 1774)
 Lymnaea (Lymnaea) stagnalis (Linnaeus, 1758)
 Radix (Peregriana) balthica (Linnaeus, 1758)
 Radix (Peregriana) dolgini (Gundrizer et Starobogatov, 1979)
 Radix (Peregriana) intermedia (Lamarck, 1822)
 Radix (Peregriana) peregra (O. F. Müller, 1774)
 Stagnicola (Stagnicola) ventricosella (B. Dybowski, 1913)

Physidae
 Aplexa hypnorum (Linnaeus, 1758)

Planorbidae
 Bathyomphalus contortus (Linnaeus, 1758)
 Gyraulus (Gyraulus) borealis (Lovén in Westerlund, 1875)
 Gyraulus (Gyraulus) stelmachoetius (Westerlund, 1881)
 Gyraulus (Gyraulus) stroemi (Westerlund, 1881)
 Hippeutis fontana (Lightfoot, 1786)

Land gastropods

Succineidae
 Succinea putris (Linnaeus, 1774)
 Succinella oblonga (Draparnaud, 1801)

Cochlicopidae
 Cochlicopa lubrica (O. F. Müller, 1774)

Vertiginidae
 Vertigo lilljeborgi Westerlund, 1868

Enidae
 Brephulopsis cylindrica (Menke, 1828)

Helicodiscidae
 Lucilla parallelus (Say, 1821)
 Lucilla scintilla (R. T. Lowe, 1852)
 Lucilla singleyana (Pilsbry, 1889)

Gastrodontidae
 Zonitoides arboreus (Say, 1916)

Oxychilidae
 Oxychilus alliarius (Miller, 1822)
 Oxychilus cellarius (O. F. Müller, 1774)
 Oxychilus draparnaudi (Beck, 1837)
 Oxychilus translucidus (Mortillet, 1854)

Pristilomatidae
 Vitrea diaphana (Studer, 1820)

Limacidae
 Bielzia coerulans (M. Bielz, 1851)
 Lehmannia valentiana (Férussac, 1823)
 Limax flavus Linnaeus, 1758
 Limax maximus Linnaeus, 1758

Agriolimacidae
 Deroceras caucasicum (Simroth, 1901)
 Deroceras laeve (O. F. Müller, 1774)
 Deroceras pollonerae (Simroth, 1889)
 Deroceras praecox Wiktor, 1966
 Deroceras reticulatum (O. F. Müller, 1774)
 Deroceras sturanyi (Simroth, 1894)
 Krynickillus melanocephalus Kaleniczenko, 1851

Boettgerillidae
 Boettgerilla pallens Simroth, 1912

Arionidae
 Arion distinctus Mabille, 1868
 Arion fasciatus (Nilsson, 1822)
 Arion lusitanicus Mabille, 1868
 Arion rufus (Linnaeus, 1758)
 Arion silvaticus Lohmander, 1937

Camaenidae
 Fruticicola fruticum (O. F. Müller, 1774)

Geomitridae
 Helicella candicans (L. Pfeiffer, 1841)
 Helicella obvia (Menke, 1828)

Hygromiidae
 Euomphalia strigella (Draparnaud, 1801)
 Pseudotrichia rubiginosa (A. Schmidt, 1853)
 Stenomphalia pisiformis (L. Pfeiffer, 1946)
 Stenomphalia ravergiensis (Férussac, 1835)
 Trochulus hispidus (Linnaeus, 1758)
 Xeropicta derbentina (Krynicki, 1836)

Helicidae
 Arianta arbustorum (Linnaeus, 1758)
 Cepaea hortensis (O.F. Müller, 1774)
 Cepaea nemoralis (Linnaeus, 1758)
 Cepaea vindobonensis (C. Pfeiffer, 1828)
 Cryptomphalus aspersa (O. F. Müller, 1774)
 Helix lucorum Linnaeus, 1758
 Helix lutescens Rossmässler, 1837
 Helix pomatia Linnaeus, 1758

Freshwater bivalves

Unionidae
 Colletopterum anatinum (Linnaeus, 1758)

Sphaeriidae
 Amesoda galitzini (Clessin, 1875)
 Cingulipisidium feroense Korniushin, 1991
 Cingulipisidium pulchricingulatum (Starobogatov et Budnikova, 1985 [1986])
 Cyclocalyx cyclocalyx (Starobogatov et Budnikova, 1985 [1986])
 Cyclocalyx gibbus (Prozorova, 1988)
 Cyclocalyx obtusalis (Lamarck, 1818)
 Euglesa (Pseudeupera) altaica (Krivosheina, 1979)
 Euglesa (Euglesa) buchtarmensis Krivosheina, 1978
 Euglesa (Euglesa) casertana (Poli, 1791)
 Euglesa (Cyclocalyx) cor (Starobogatov et Streletzkaja, 1967)
 Euglesa (Cingulipisidium) crassa (Stelfox, 1918)
 Euglesa (Cingulipisidium) depressinitida Anistratenko et Starobogatov, 1990[1991]
 Euglesa (Cingulipisidium) fedderseni (Westerlund, 1890)
 Euglesa (Pseudeupera) humiliumbo Krivosheina, 1978
 Euglesa (Cyclocalyx) johanseni Dolgin et Korniushin, 1994
 Euglesa (Cyclocalyx) magnifica (Clessin in Westerlund, 1873)
 Euglesa (Pseudeupera) mucronata (Clessin in Westerlund, 1877)
 Euglesa (Euglesa) obliquata (Clessin in Martens, 1874)
 Euglesa (Pseudosphaerium) pseudosphaerium (Favre, 1927)
 Euglesa (Pulchelleuglesa) pulchella (Jenyns, 1832)
 Euglesa (Cyclocalyx) scholtzii (Clessin, 1873)
 Euglesa (Henslowiana) sibirica (Clessin in Westerlund, 1877)
 Euglesa (Pseudeupera) subtruncata (Malm, 1855)
 Henslowiana baudonii (Clessin, 1873)
 Henslowiana henslowana (Leach in Sheppard, 1823)
 Henslowiana ostroumovi (Pirogov et Starobogatov, 1974)
 Henslowiana polonica (Anistratenko et Starobogatov, 1990 [1991])
 Henslowiana suecica (Clessin in Westerlund, 1873)
 Henslowiana supina (A. Schmidt, 1850)
 Henslowiana tenuicostulata (Krivosheina, 1978)
 Lacustrina dilatata (Westerlund, 1897)
 Musculium compressum (Middendorff, 1851)
 Musculium (Musculium) creplini (Dunker, 1845)
 Musculium hungaricum (Hazay, 1881)
 Musculium (Paramusculium) inflatum (Middendorff, 1851)
 Neopisidium moitessierianum (Paladilhe, 1866)
 Nucleocyclas radiata (Westerlund, 1897)
 Parasphaerium nitida (Clessin in Westerlund, 1876)
 Pisidium amnicum (Müller, 1774)
 Pisidium (Pisidium) decurtatum Lindholm, 1909
 Pisidium (Pisidium) inflatum Megerle von Mühlfeld in Porro, 1838
 Pseudeupera pirogovi (Starobogatov in Stadnichenko, 1984)
 Pseudeupera starobogatovi (Krivosheina, 1978)
 Pseudeupera tenuicardo (Krivosheina, 1978)
 Roseana globularis (Clessin in Westerlund, 1873)
 Roseana rosea (Scholtz, 1843)
 Sphaerium (Cyrenastrum) asiaticum (Martens, 1864)
 Sphaerium (Cyrenastrum) caperatum Westerlund, 1897
 Sphaerium corneum (Linnaeus, 1758)
 Sphaerium (Nucleocyclas) falsinucleus (Novikov in Starobogatov et Korniushin, 1986 [1987])
 Sphaerium (Sphaerium) levinodis Westerlund, 1876
 Sphaerium (Sphaerium) mamillanum Westerlund, 1871
 Sphaerium (Nucleocyclas) ovale (Férussac, 1807)
 Sphaerium (Parasphaerium) rectidens Starobogatov et Streletzkaja, 1967
 Sphaerium (Sphaerium) scaldianum (Normand, 1844)
 Sphaerium (Sphaerium) westerlundi Clessin in Westerlund, 1873

See also

 List of marine molluscs of Russia

Lists of molluscs of surrounding countries:
 List of non-marine molluscs of Norway
 List of non-marine molluscs of Finland
 List of non-marine molluscs of Poland
 List of non-marine molluscs of Estonia
 List of non-marine molluscs of Latvia
 List of non-marine molluscs of Lithuania
 List of non-marine molluscs of Belarus
 List of non-marine molluscs of Ukraine
 List of non-marine molluscs of Georgia
 List of non-marine molluscs of Azerbaijan
 List of non-marine molluscs of Kazakhstan
 List of non-marine molluscs of Mongolia
 List of non-marine molluscs of China
 List of non-marine molluscs of North Korea

References

Molluscs
Russia
Russia